Ventrifossa is a genus of rattails in the family Macrouridae.

Species
There are currently 23 recognized species in this genus
 Ventrifossa atherodon (C. H. Gilbert & Cramer, 1897) (Arrowtooth grenadier)
 Ventrifossa ctenomelas (C. H. Gilbert & Cramer, 1897) (Hawaiian grenadier)
 Ventrifossa divergens C. H. Gilbert & C. L. Hubbs, 1920 (Plainfin grenadier) 
 Ventrifossa garmani (D. S. Jordan & C. H. Gilbert, 1904) (Sagami grenadier) 
 Ventrifossa gomoni Iwamoto & A. Williams, 1999 (Pale smiling whiptail)
 Ventrifossa johnboborum Iwamoto, 1982 (Snoutscale whiptail)
 Ventrifossa longibarbata Okamura, 1982 
 Ventrifossa macrodon Sazonov & Iwamoto, 1992
 Ventrifossa macropogon N. B. Marshall, 1973 (Longbeard grenadier)
 Ventrifossa macroptera Okamura, 1982 (Palau grenadier) 
 Ventrifossa misakia (D. S. Jordan & C. H. Gilbert, 1904) (Misaki grenadier) 
 Ventrifossa mucocephalus N. B. Marshall, 1973 (Slimehead grenadier)
 Ventrifossa mystax Iwamoto & M. E. Anderson, 1994
 Ventrifossa nasuta (J. L. B. Smith, 1935) (Conesnout grenadier)
 Ventrifossa nigrodorsalis C. H. Gilbert & C. L. Hubbs, 1920 (Spinaker grenadier) 
 Ventrifossa obtusirostris Sazonov & Iwamoto, 1992
 Ventrifossa paxtoni Iwamoto & A. Williams, 1999 (Thinbarbel whiptail)
 Ventrifossa petersonii (Alcock, 1891) (Peterson's grenadier)
 Ventrifossa rhipidodorsalis Okamura, 1984 
 Ventrifossa saikaiensis Okamura, 1984 
 Ventrifossa sazonovi Iwamoto & A. Williams, 1999 (Dark smiling whiptail) 
 Ventrifossa teres Sazonov & Iwamoto, 1992
 Ventrifossa vinolenta Iwamoto & Merrett, 1997

References

Macrouridae
Extant Miocene first appearances